The UHF connector is a name for a threaded RF connector. 
The connector design was invented in the 1930s for use in the radio industry, and is a shielded form of the "banana plug". It is a widely used standard connector for HF transmission lines on full-sized radio equipment, with BNC connectors predominating for smaller, hand-held equipment.

The name "UHF" is a source of confusion, since the name of the connectors did not change when the frequency ranges were renamed. The design was named during an era when "UHF" meant frequencies over 30 MHz. Today, Ultra high frequency (UHF) instead refers to frequencies between 300 MHz and 3 GHz and the range of frequencies formerly known as UHF is now called "VHF".

Unlike modern connector designs that replaced it, no active specification or standard exists to govern the mechanical and electrical characteristics of the so-called "UHF" connector system making it effectively a deprecated design with no guarantee for suitability to an electrical or mechanical purpose.. Evidence of inconsistency exists. Testing reveals post WWII connectors designs, such as N connector and BNC connector are electrically superior to the 'UHF' connector for modern UHF frequencies. Other testing reveals one UHF connector sample shows negligible effect on frequencies up to 435 MHz.

Other names
The connector reliably carries signals at frequencies up to 100 MHz.  The coupling shell has a  inch 24 tpi UNEF standard thread.
The most popular cable plug and corresponding chassis-mount socket carry the old Signal Corps nomenclatures PL-259 (plug) and SO-239 (socket).  These are also known as Navy type 49190 and 49194 respectively. A double-ended SO-239 connector is designated as an SO-238.

PL-259, SO-239, PL-258, and several other related military references refer to one specific mechanical design collectively known as the UHF Connector. In some countries, for example in Israel, the term 'PL connector' is confusingly associated rather with the analog phone connector. The designations come from the Joint Electronics Type Designation System, its predecessor AN system, and the earlier SCR (Set, Complete, Radio) system.

Characteristics

Mechanical
By design, all connectors in the UHF connector family mate using the  inch 24 tpi threaded shell for the shield connection and an approximately 0.156 inch-diameter (4 mm) pin and socket for the inner conductor. Similar connectors (M connectors) with an incompatible 16 mm diameter, 1 mm metric thread have been produced, but these are not standard UHF connectors by definition.

Surge impedance
UHF connectors have a non-constant surge impedance. For this reason, UHF connectors are generally usable through HF and the lower portion of what is now known as the VHF frequency range.
Despite the name, the UHF connector is rarely used in commercial applications for today's UHF frequencies, as the non-constant surge impedance creates measurable electrical signal reflections above 100 MHz.

Virtually all of the impedance bump and loss is in the UHF female. A typical SO-239 UHF female, properly hooded, has an impedance bump of about 35 ohms. The length of the bump is typically  inch, where the female pin flares to fit over the male pin. This bump can be mitigated by using a honeycomb dielectric in the female pin area. Many VHF/UHF amateur operators use special UHF females that maintain a 50 ohm surge impedance.

Power
Some samples of UHF connectors can handle RF peak power levels well over one kilowatt based on the voltage rating of 500 Volts peak. In practice, some UHF connector products will handle over 4 kV peak voltage. Manufacturers typically test UHF jumpers in the 3-5 kV range. UHF connectors are standard on HF amateur amplifiers rated at 1500+ Watts output.

In practice, voltage limit is set by the air gap between center and shield. The center pin diameter and contact area is large enough that pin heating is not an issue. UHF connectors are generally limited by cable heating rather than connector failure.

Environmental tolerance
The UHF connector is not weatherproof.

Applications
In many applications, UHF connectors were replaced by designs that have a more uniform surge impedance over the length of the connector, such as the N connector and the BNC connector. UHF connectors are still widely used in amateur radio, Citizens Band radio, and marine VHF radio applications.

See also
 Miniature UHF connector
 RF connector

Notes

References

RF connectors